Torsten Kühnemund (born 28 July 1964) is a German former fencer. He competed in the individual épée event for East Germany at the 1988 Summer Olympics, finishing fifth.

References

External links
 

1964 births
Living people
German male fencers
Olympic fencers of East Germany
Fencers at the 1988 Summer Olympics
People from Wittenberg
Sportspeople from Saxony-Anhalt